Laval-Pradel is a commune in the Gard department in southern France.

Population

See also
Communes of the Gard department

References

External links

The Regordane Way or St Gilles Trail, which passes through Le Pradel.

Communes of Gard